Yarazarvi is a village in Belgaum district in the southern state of Karnataka, India. As at 2011, the population of the town is 4,928 people, with 914 houses and families, 2,518 of the people being male, 2,410 of the people female. A total of 700 children in the town are aged 0–6, with 354 male, the remaining 346 are female. These people speak Kannada, Marathi, and English. The literacy rate of the town was 50.14%, the male literacy 62.71%, while the female literacy is 36.97%. A total of 2,463 people in the town are part of the workforce, with 1,459 of the workers male, 1,004 are female.

Villages in Belagavi district